National Anti-Ship Missile (Míssil Antinavio Nacional, MANSUP) also named AV-RE40 —previously known as MAN-1—is a US$75 million anti-ship missile project under development by Avibras, Mectron, Atech and Omnisys for the Brazilian Navy. The design aims to achieve performance similar to MBDA MM40 Exocet Block II. It is expected to begin field tests in 2017, and should begin production around late 2018 or early 2019.

History
A mock-up of the Brazilian Navy and Avibras project for an anti-ship missile inspired by the AM39 Exocet was shown in April 2011 during Latin America Aero and Defence (LAAD) exhibition in Rio de Janeiro.

An initial asset of R$50 million was sponsored by the Brazilian Navy, through the Directorate of Navy Weapons Systems, contracts were signed on 5 and 6 December 2011, with Mectron and Avibras, respectively. Program participants were assigned according to their specialties, Mectron being assigned to prototype development, Avibras to rocket engine development, Omnisys to seeker-head development and Atech to project accompaniment management.

In 2013, Omnisys concluded the missile seeker PDR (Preliminary Design Review) and started to test all subsystem parts. Development of an air launched variant of the missile called Missil Antinavio Nacional lancado por Aeronaves (MANAER) commenced in February 2014.

On November 27, 2018 the first missile prototype was fired from the Brazilian Navy corvette Barroso. On March 20, 2019, a second launch was carried out by the frigate Independência (F44). A third prototype was fired once again by the F44 on July 10.

On September 20, 2022, the Navy conducted the fourth launch of MANSUP from the frigate Constituição (F42), as part of the qualifying campaign, ahead of the series produced missiles.

The Navy intends to use the MANSUP variants as the armament of the Riachuelo-class SSKs, Álvaro Alberto-class SSNs, and the Tamandaré-class frigates.

Specifications 
 Range: Approximately 100 km
 Guidance: Active radar homing

See also

TPNer a Brazilian heavyweight torpedo developed by Mectron
Anti-ship missile
List of missiles

References
Notes

Bibliography

 
 

Guided missiles of Brazil
Naval weapons of Brazil
Anti-ship missiles